Porta coeli ("Heaven's Gate" in Latin) is a 13th-century convent (women monastery) located in Předklášteří, near Tišnov, South Moravian Region, Czech Republic, after which the asteroid 3276 Porta Coeli is named. Situated in the valley of the Svratka River, this Cistercian convent was founded in 1233 by Constance of Hungary (who was also buried here), widow of Czech King Otakar I.

The church was consecrated in 1239 by Bernhard, Bishop of Prague with approval and at presence of Robert the Englishman, Bishop of Olomouc. It has three aisles, a transept and a rather long sanctuary ending in a five-sided apse. Despite the austerity of the Cistercian rules, the western façade has a portal reminiscent of French cathedrals. It is unique in the Czech Republic.

The interior contains valuable Baroque furnishings from after 1764; on the high altar there is a painting by F. A. Maulbertsch, sculpture by Andreas Schweigl, and other paintings by the Jesuit artist Ignác Raab. The cloister walk is worthy of note because of its early Gothic vaulting, its capitals, figurative and decorative carvings and the chapter house, built between 1260 and 1270.

There is also a brewery situated on the premises of the monastery – it was opened in 2019 and named Vorkloster, which is the German name of Předklášteří – the village where the monastery is located.

Gallery

References

External links
 Klášter Porta coeli – official webpage 

Convents of the Catholic Church in Europe
Cistercian monasteries in the Czech Republic
Roman Catholic churches in the Czech Republic
13th-century Roman Catholic church buildings in the Czech Republic
Buildings and structures in the South Moravian Region
Tourist attractions in the South Moravian Region
National Cultural Monuments of the Czech Republic
Brno-Country District